Giambattista Magistrini (1777 – 1849) was an Italian mathematician.

From 1804 he was professor of calculation at the University of Bologna.

From 1811 he was a fellow of the Accademia nazionale delle scienze.

Works

References 

1777 births
1849 deaths
19th-century Italian mathematicians
Academic staff of the University of Bologna